Uranolophina is a small order of prehistoric lungfishes which lived during the Devonian period.

Phylogeny
 Sarcopterygii (Class)
 Dipnoi (Subclass)
 Uranolophina (Order)
 Uranolophidae (Family)

References 

Prehistoric lungfish
Prehistoric fish orders
Devonian bony fish